Adoretus is a genus of Scarabaeidae or scarab beetles. They are native to Africa and Asia, and two species occur in Europe.

Description 
Adoretus beetles are elongate and oval in shape, 10-12 long, and brown with a covering of white/cream setae. The head has a broad, circular clypeus with a reflexed margin. Underneath this is a labrum with a median apical projection overhanging the mentum. There is a pair of antennae, each with 9-10 segments and a 3-segmented club. The pronotum has a thickened setose border. The elytra are irregularly coarsely punctate, and the disc usually has 2-3 raised longitudinal lines. There are three pairs of legs. The first pair has two or three teeth on each tibia. The tarsi of the second and third leg pairs are simple and asymmetrical. The tibiae of the last leg pair have truncate apices, each with two apical spurs situated close together. 

Different species look very similar and can only be told apart by examining genitalia of males or by molecular identification tools.

Diet 
Adults of Adoretus appear to be generalist herbivores, feeding on leaves of a wide range of plants. The larvae are associated with roots and feed on either live or dead plant tissue, depending on the species.

Pests 
Several species of Adoretus are pests. Their eggs and larvae may be easily transported to new locations in the soil or roots of cultivated plants.

 Adoretus bicolor feeds on grapevine (Vitis spp.), peanut (Arachis hypogaea) and rose (Rosa spp.). It occurs in India.
 Adoretus caliginosus feeds on cotton (Gossypium hirsutum). It occurs in Pakistan.
 Adoretus compresses feeds on lychee (Litchi chinensis). It occurs in Africa, Asia and Australasia.
 Adoretus hirsutus feeds on lychee as well. It occurs in China and Taiwan.
 Adoretus ranunculus feeds on cocoa (Theobroma cacao). It occurs in the Philippines.
 Adoretus sinicus feeds on over 250 species in 56 plant families. It occurs in Asia and the Pacific Islands.
 Adoretus tenuimaculatus feeds on 186 species in 42 plant families. It occurs in China, Japan and Taiwan.
 Adoretus versutus feeds on cacao, coffee (Coffea arabica), rose and various vegetable and ornamental plants. It occurs in Asia, Africa, Australasia and the Pacific Islands.

Species

A

 Adoretus abdolrezagharibi
 Adoretus abyssinicus
 Adoretus acniceps
 Adoretus aculeatus
 Adoretus adustus
 Adoretus aegrotus
 Adoretus aeneiceps
 Adoretus aeneopiceus
 Adoretus aenescens
 Adoretus aeneus
 Adoretus aeruginosus
 Adoretus affinis
 Adoretus afghanus
 Adoretus agnatus
 Adoretus albolineatus
 Adoretus albomitratus
 Adoretus alocopygus
 Adoretus amitinus
 Adoretus amoenus
 Adoretus ampliatus
 Adoretus andrewesi
 Adoretus angustus
 Adoretus aquilonis
 Adoretus areatus
 Adoretus ariel
 Adoretus arrowi
 Adoretus asperopunctatus
 Adoretus atiqi
 Adoretus aurantiacus
 Adoretus avitus

B

 Adoretus bakeri
 Adoretus baquari
 Adoretus bechuanus
 Adoretus bechynei
 Adoretus beiranus
 Adoretus bengalensis
 Adoretus bernhardi
 Adoretus bhutanensis
 Adoretus bicaudatus
 Adoretus bicolor
 Adoretus bidenticeps
 Adoretus bilobatus
 Adoretus bimarginatus
 Adoretus birmanus
 Adoretus bombinator
 Adoretus boops
 Adoretus borbonicus
 Adoretus borneensis
 Adoretus bottegoi
 Adoretus brachypygus
 Adoretus brahmanus
 Adoretus brancsik
 Adoretus breviunguiculatus

C

 Adoretus cachecticus
 Adoretus caliginosus
 Adoretus calvus
 Adoretus capicola
 Adoretus capito
 Adoretus cardoni
 Adoretus carinilabris
 Adoretus celebicus
 Adoretus celogaster
 Adoretus cephalotes
 Adoretus chascoproctus
 Adoretus chinchonae
 Adoretus ciliatus
 Adoretus cirroseriatus
 Adoretus claustifer
 Adoretus clypeatus
 Adoretus cochinchinensis
 Adoretus compressus
 Adoretus congoensis
 Adoretus consularis
 Adoretus convexicollis
 Adoretus convexus
 Adoretus coronatus
 Adoretus corpulentus
 Adoretus costalis
 Adoretus costipennis
 Adoretus costopilosus
 Adoretus costulatus
 Adoretus cribratus
 Adoretus cribricollis
 Adoretus cribrosus
 Adoretus cristatus
 Adoretus cupreus
 Adoretus curtulus
 Adoretus cylindricus
 Adoretus cyrtopygus

D

 Adoretus debilis
 Adoretus deccanus
 Adoretus decorsei
 Adoretus delkeskampi
 Adoretus densepunctatus
 Adoretus denticrus
 Adoretus depilatus
 Adoretus depressus
 Adoretus digennaroi
 Adoretus dilleri
 Adoretus discoidalis
 Adoretus discolor
 Adoretus disparilis
 Adoretus dissidens
 Adoretus distinguendus
 Adoretus divergens
 Adoretus diversicolor
 Adoretus djallonus
 Adoretus drescheri
 Adoretus drurei
 Adoretus dulcis
 Adoretus duplicatus
 Adoretus duvauceli

E

 Adoretus elongatus
 Adoretus emarginatus
 Adoretus endroedii
 Adoretus epipleuralis
 Adoretus ermineus
 Adoretus erythrocephalus
 Adoretus evelynae
 Adoretus exasperans
 Adoretus excisiceps
 Adoretus excisus
 Adoretus exiguus
 Adoretus exitialis
 Adoretus exsculptus
 Adoretus exsecatus

F

 Adoretus faccai
 Adoretus fairmairei
 Adoretus falciungulatus
 Adoretus fallaciosus
 Adoretus fascicularis
 Adoretus fatehi
 Adoretus feminalis
 Adoretus femoratus
 Adoretus flaveolus
 Adoretus flavilabris
 Adoretus flavipennis
 Adoretus flavipes
 Adoretus flavohumeralis
 Adoretus flavomaculatus
 Adoretus flavus
 Adoretus formosanus
 Adoretus franzi
 Adoretus fraterculus
 Adoretus fraudator
 Adoretus fraudulentus
 Adoretus freudei
 Adoretus fruhstorferi
 Adoretus fulvus
 Adoretus fumatus
 Adoretus furcifer
 Adoretus furutai
 Adoretus fusciceps
 Adoretus fuscoseriatus
 Adoretus fuscovittatus
 Adoretus fusculus

G

 Adoretus gaillardi
 Adoretus gandolphei
 Adoretus ganganus
 Adoretus garamas
 Adoretus gazella
 Adoretus gemmifer
 Adoretus geyri
 Adoretus ghanaensis
 Adoretus ghindanus
 Adoretus giganteus
 Adoretus goniopygus
 Adoretus goudoti
 Adoretus graniceps
 Adoretus granulifrons
 Adoretus gressetti
 Adoretus gressitti
 Adoretus griseosetosus
 Adoretus grisescens
 Adoretus guttulatus
 Adoretus gymnotopus

H

 Adoretus hainanensis
 Adoretus hanoiensis
 Adoretus hanstroemi
 Adoretus hexagonus
 Adoretus hirasawai
 Adoretus hiriticulus
 Adoretus hirsutus
 Adoretus hirticollis
 Adoretus hirtipennis
 Adoretus hispidus
 Adoretus hoplioides
 Adoretus horticola
 Adoretus hybogeneius
 Adoretus hypudaeus

I

 Adoretus ibanus
 Adoretus ictericus
 Adoretus iftikhari
 Adoretus illitus
 Adoretus imitator
 Adoretus impurus
 Adoretus inconditus
 Adoretus incongruens
 Adoretus incurvatus
 Adoretus indutus
 Adoretus inexpectatus
 Adoretus infans
 Adoretus inglorius
 Adoretus inornatus
 Adoretus inseparabilis
 Adoretus interruptus
 Adoretus irakanus
 Adoretus ismaili

J-K

 Adoretus jarkandus
 Adoretus javanus
 Adoretus jipensis
 Adoretus juengeri
 Adoretus kahlei
 Adoretus kamberanus
 Adoretus kanarensis
 Adoretus kaszabi
 Adoretus khartumensis
 Adoretus khasmarensis
 Adoretus kindiae
 Adoretus klossi
 Adoretus kororensis
 Adoretus kulzeri

L

 Adoretus lacunus
 Adoretus lacustris
 Adoretus lacuum
 Adoretus ladakanus
 Adoretus lajoyi
 Adoretus langsonicus
 Adoretus laosensis
 Adoretus laoticus
 Adoretus lasiopygus
 Adoretus lasius
 Adoretus laticeps
 Adoretus latirostris
 Adoretus latissimus
 Adoretus latiusculus
 Adoretus lemniscus
 Adoretus leo
 Adoretus lepus
 Adoretus limbatus
 Adoretus lineatus
 Adoretus lithobius
 Adoretus lobiceps
 Adoretus loeffleri
 Adoretus longiceps
 Adoretus lopezi
 Adoretus luridus
 Adoretus luteipes
 Adoretus lutescens
 Adoretus lutosipennis

M

 Adoretus machatschkei
 Adoretus macrops
 Adoretus maculatus
 Adoretus maculicollis
 Adoretus madibirensis
 Adoretus malaccanus
 Adoretus maniculus
 Adoretus manyaraensis
 Adoretus marahnus
 Adoretus marshalli
 Adoretus mashunus
 Adoretus matsumotoi
 Adoretus mauritianus
 Adoretus mavis
 Adoretus melanesius
 Adoretus melvillensis
 Adoretus meo
 Adoretus metasternalis
 Adoretus meticulosus
 Adoretus minutus
 Adoretus mizusawai
 Adoretus monticola
 Adoretus morosus
 Adoretus moultoni
 Adoretus murinus
 Adoretus mus
 Adoretus musillus
 Adoretus myodes

N

 Adoretus naeemi
 Adoretus nagyi
 Adoretus nanshanchianus
 Adoretus nasalis
 Adoretus nasutus
 Adoretus nathani
 Adoretus neghellianus
 Adoretus nephriticus
 Adoretus nietneri
 Adoretus niger
 Adoretus nigrifrons
 Adoretus nigritarsis
 Adoretus nigrofuscus
 Adoretus nitens
 Adoretus nitidus
 Adoretus nossibeicus
 Adoretus nubilus
 Adoretus nudocostatus
 Adoretus nyassicus

O

 Adoretus obatoides
 Adoretus obscurus
 Adoretus occultus
 Adoretus ochraceus
 Adoretus ohausi
 Adoretus ohmomoi
 Adoretus opeticus
 Adoretus ovalis
 Adoretus ovampoensis
 Adoretus ovatoides
 Adoretus ovatus

P

 Adoretus pachysomatus
 Adoretus paiensis
 Adoretus palawanus
 Adoretus pallens
 Adoretus pallidus
 Adoretus paolii
 Adoretus parviceps
 Adoretus patrizii
 Adoretus patruelis
 Adoretus pauliani
 Adoretus peregrinus
 Adoretus perrieri
 Adoretus persicus
 Adoretus petrovitzi
 Adoretus peyerimhoffi
 Adoretus piciventris
 Adoretus picticollis
 Adoretus pictipennis
 Adoretus piscator
 Adoretus pitaulti
 Adoretus plebejus
 Adoretus pleuralis
 Adoretus pliciventris
 Adoretus plumbicollis
 Adoretus polycanthus
 Adoretus popei
 Adoretus postfoveatus
 Adoretus posticalis
 Adoretus progrediens
 Adoretus prudens
 Adoretus pruinosus
 Adoretus puberulus
 Adoretus pubipennis
 Adoretus pudicus
 Adoretus pullus
 Adoretus pulverulentus
 Adoretus pumilio
 Adoretus punctipennis
 Adoretus punjabensis
 Adoretus pusillus

Q-R

 Adoretus quadridens
 Adoretus quadripunctatus
 Adoretus radicosus
 Adoretus ranunculus
 Adoretus reichenbachi
 Adoretus renardi
 Adoretus rhamphomorius
 Adoretus rhodophilus
 Adoretus rondoni
 Adoretus rosettae
 Adoretus rothkirchi
 Adoretus rubenyani
 Adoretus rufifrons
 Adoretus rufulus
 Adoretus rufus
 Adoretus rugosohirtus
 Adoretus rugosus
 Adoretus rugulosus
 Adoretus runcinatus
 Adoretus rusticus

S

 Adoretus saetipennis
 Adoretus saigonensis
 Adoretus saitoi
 Adoretus saleemi
 Adoretus sandakanus
 Adoretus scabious
 Adoretus sciurinus
 Adoretus scutellaris
 Adoretus sebakuensis
 Adoretus semperi
 Adoretus senatorius
 Adoretus senegallius
 Adoretus senescens
 Adoretus senohi
 Adoretus seriegranatus
 Adoretus seriesetosus
 Adoretus serratipes
 Adoretus serridens
 Adoretus setifer
 Adoretus sexdentatus
 Adoretus seydeli
 Adoretus siemsseni
 Adoretus siganus
 Adoretus sikorae
 Adoretus silfverbergi
 Adoretus silonicus
 Adoretus similis
 Adoretus simplex
 Adoretus simulans
 Adoretus simulatus
 Adoretus sincerus
 Adoretus singhalensis
 Adoretus sinicus
 Adoretus sistanicus
 Adoretus somalinus
 Adoretus sorex
 Adoretus sparsesetosus
 Adoretus speculator
 Adoretus sterbae
 Adoretus stoliczkae
 Adoretus striatus
 Adoretus subaenescens
 Adoretus subcostatus
 Adoretus subguttatus
 Adoretus sucki
 Adoretus sudanicus
 Adoretus sulcirostris
 Adoretus sumbanus
 Adoretus sundaicus
 Adoretus suturalis
 Adoretus suturellus

T

 Adoretus tananus
 Adoretus tener
 Adoretus tenimbricus
 Adoretus tenuimaculatus
 Adoretus tessulatus
 Adoretus testaceus
 Adoretus tetracanthus
 Adoretus tibialis
 Adoretus tigrinus
 Adoretus timidus
 Adoretus timoriensis
 Adoretus tonkinensis
 Adoretus transvaalensis
 Adoretus trichostigma
 Adoretus tricolor
 Adoretus tsavoensis
 Adoretus tuberculiventris
 Adoretus tufaili
 Adoretus turkanus

U-Z

 Adoretus ubonensis
 Adoretus umbilicatus
 Adoretus umbrosus
 Adoretus uncifer
 Adoretus ungulatus
 Adoretus uniformis
 Adoretus vagepunctatus
 Adoretus variegatus
 Adoretus velutinus
 Adoretus versutus
 Adoretus vestitus
 Adoretus vethi
 Adoretus victoriae
 Adoretus vietnamensis
 Adoretus vigillans
 Adoretus villicollis
 Adoretus villosicollis
 Adoretus villosus
 Adoretus vitalisi
 Adoretus vitticauda
 Adoretus vittiger
 Adoretus vittipennis
 Adoretus vulpeculus
 Adoretus wallacei
 Adoretus xanthomerus
 Adoretus zavattarii
 Adoretus zumpti

References

Scarabaeidae genera
Rutelinae